Michael Vincent Curran (born April 14, 1944) is a retired American ice hockey goaltender.  He led the United States to a surprising silver medal at the 1972 Winter Olympics after representing the USA at the 1970 and 1971 Ice Hockey World Championship. He turned professional with the Minnesota Fighting Saints of the upstart World Hockey Association in 1972–73 and quickly became one of the early star goaltenders of the new league, playing in the 1973 WHA All-Star Game. Curran lost his job in 1976 when the Fighting Saints folded, but he returned to international hockey with Team USA at the 1976 and 1977 Ice Hockey World Championship as well as the 1976 Canada Cup. He retired following the 1977 season after a second stint with the revived Fighting Saints WHA franchise. Currently, Curran works as the headmaster at a prestigious private school.

Curran was inducted into the International Ice Hockey Federation Hall of Fame in 1999 and the United States Hockey Hall of Fame in 1998.  He was born in International Falls, Minnesota.

Awards and honors

References
 
 Hockeygoalies.org bio
 

1944 births
American men's ice hockey goaltenders
Ice hockey players from Minnesota
Ice hockey players at the 1972 Winter Olympics
IIHF Hall of Fame inductees
Johnstown Jets (NAHL) players
Living people
Medalists at the 1972 Winter Olympics
Minnesota Fighting Saints players
Olympic silver medalists for the United States in ice hockey
People from International Falls, Minnesota
Rochester Americans players
United States Hockey Hall of Fame inductees